The Redeemer, also known as The Redeemer... Son of Satan! and Class Reunion Massacre, is a 1978 American horror film directed by Constantine S. Gochis. It follows a group of people trapped inside their high school during a ten-year reunion who are being killed off by a mysterious killer known as The Redeemer.

Plot
A young boy, named Christopher, emerges from a rural lake, fully clothed, and walks to a road where he is picked up by a shuttle bus and taken with other young boys to a local church where they are part of the boys choir. During the church service, the preacher, known only as the Redeemer, arrives and gives a hate-filled sermon about the sins of the world and of six people who have lived their life of sin, each of them 1967 graduates of the now-shuttered Stuart Morse Academy.

The six individuals receive invitations to 10-year high school reunion: John Sinclair, an unscrupulous and corrupt lawyer; Cindy, a freewheeling party girl; Terry, a glutton and slacker; Jane, a wealthy and shallow heiress; Roger, a vain film actor; and Kirsten, a closeted, self-loathing lesbian.

At the school, a mysterious man arrives claiming to be a property inspector and is let into the building by the janitor. The man then shoots the janitor to death in the swimming pool area and, after hiding the body, makes a plaster mold of the janitor's face to make a latex mask for himself.

John, Cindy, Terry, Jane, Roger and Kirsten arrive at the school where the man, in disguise as the janitor, lets them into the building where they find a decorated ballroom complete with food and drinks, but no one else present. As everyone settle down to eat and talk, they discuss how they are the only six to arrive and why they received the same strange invite despite that most of them barely knew each other in school. While exploring the building, they find the dead body of the janitor and when they try to leave, the find themselves locked in the building with the killer who proceeds to harass, stalk and kill them one by one.

Terry is the first to die when he is set on fire and burns to death by blowtorch set up to a tripwire in the school office. Jane is next when she manages to get out of the building and encounters a hunter outside who promises to help, only the hunter is the killer in disguise who shoots her with his shotgun and returns her body to the school. While searching for a way out, the four remaining people encounter the killer, now disguised as a magician, wearing a tuxedo with a flowing black cape, in the school auditorium who kills Roger by another contraption involving a suspended dagger to fall on his head. While trying to find a way out in the locker room, Cindy is attacked by the killer, now wearing clown mask costume, who drowns her in a sink filled with water.

In the school office, John encounters the unmasked killer, who reveals himself to have lured the group to the school to kill them for their life of sin that they built for themselves and explains that knows all about John and his career as a criminal lawyer who gets criminals off on legal technicalities. The killer claims to be a "redeemer" who has been chosen to rid the world of the wicked by being to kill a select few. John and the Redeemer struggle over a gun, where in the struggle the Redeemer gets shot in his side, but manages to best John and shoots him in the head, killing him. The wounded killer then chases Kirsten through the school and back to the auditorium where she knocks the gun away from the Redeemer, and attempts to shoot him again, but the Redeemer takes command of a clown dummy who raises a knife to bring it down on Kirsten, killing her.

The ending comes full circle as the Redeemer, revealed to be the priest in the opening scene, returns to his church where he concludes the sermon he started at the beginning of the film who claims that "those who have sinned" have been given "redemption" for their own afterlife. After the service ends, the Redeemer meets with the young boy, Christopher, who has revealed to have killed a bully who earlier threatened him and placed the dead body in the car of a con artist Bible salesman who visited the church. Christopher tells the Redeemer that everything will be all right now, and that he is pleased with the Redeemer's work. The Redeemer then goes back to his apartment where he tends to his bullet wound to his abdomen that he received earlier, and also reveals that he has two thumbs on his left hand, one of which then fades away. The Redeemer quotes to himself that God is pleased with what he has done and he will be waiting for any future work. In the final scene, Christopher takes the church shuttle bus back to the lake from the opening scene and walks (fully clothed) into the lake to return from where he came.

The film closes with the text: "From out of the darkness the hand of the Redeemer shall appear to punish those who have lived in sin... and return to the watery depths of Hell".

Cast

Production

The film was completed over a period of three months between April 11, 1977 and July 21, 1977. Reshoots were done in January 1978. It was filmed almost entirely at the former Staunton Military Academy in Staunton, Virginia.

Release

The Redeemer premiered in Staunton, Virginia on June 21, 1978. It subsequently opened theatrically in Los Angeles on October 25, 1978. The film has two alternate titles: The Redeemer... Son of Satan! and Class Reunion Massacre.

Critical response 

In a review published in the Los Angeles Times, it was noted: "In a year of trashy C-minus movies, The Redeemer (citywide) takes the prize as the worst. It's a badly acted, stiffly photographed, vile film that mixes together And Then There Were None, Whatever Happened to the Class of '65? and The Omen, then tosses in the Seven Deadly Sins as an afterthought. The film is directed with theatrical hysteria, too many arbitrary long shots and repulsive violence by Constantine S. Gochis." Fred Pfisterer of The News Leader wrote: "The plot contains some grisly and colorful murderseight or nine, it's hard to keep scoreis confusing ... The camera work is good; the acting by mainly Washington-area residents, passable."

Of retrospective reviews, the UK horror film review website Hysteria Lives! gave the film 1 of 5 stars, criticizing the film for what they called "its warped morality". They concluded the review by writing, "There are some really nice touches here: good cinematography; a genuinely creepy ambience and a likeable . It's just a shame they ended up in mean-spirited junk like this." The Terror Trap awarded the film 2.5 out of 4 stars, calling it "surprisingly well-crafted".
Todd Martin from HorrorNews.net gave the film a positive review, calling it "an underrated classic". AllMovie called it a "genuinely disturbing proto-slasher" that is "guilty of the same gaping plot holes and cardboard characterizations as any other, but a good cast, creepy ambiance and swift pace make it an obscure gem." Joseph A. Ziemba from Bleeding Skull! called it "creepy, unsettling, and places all bets on the mysterious side of things". Ziemba also praised the film's cinematography, killer, mystery factor, and  uncomfortable tone. Wes R. from Oh, the Horror! wrote "The Redeemer: Son of Satan! is a truly great, forgotten horror movie. Yes, it's got  cheesy problems just like any other film of its era, but it also builds a sense of foreboding doom more palpable than a lot of movies I have encountered." Ian Jane from DVD Talk gave the film a positive review, concluding, "Ultimately, despite the fact that it's basically a stalk and slash, The Redeemer has enough going for it in terms of creativity and unpredictability that horror fans should find a lot to like about the movie. It's not a perfect film and there are moments that work better than others, but overall there's plenty of entertainment value here and even a couple of creepy thrills."

Home media
The Redeemer was released on VHS by Continental Video in 1985 under the title Class Reunion Massacre. It was later released on VHS by Victory Multimedia on September 13, 1995.
The film was released on DVD by Code Red on October 19, 2010. It was later released by Desert Island Films, under the alternate title Class Reunion Massacre on August 1, 2012.

References

External links 
 
 
 
 
 

1978 films
1978 horror films
1970s supernatural horror films
1978 independent films
1970s serial killer films
1970s slasher films
American independent films
American serial killer films
American supernatural horror films
American slasher films
Dimension Pictures films
Films shot in Virginia
Films about mass murder
Religious horror films
1970s English-language films
1970s American films